Karl Hansen (30 July 1902 – 27 August 1965) was a Norwegian cyclist. He competed in the individual road race event at the 1928 Summer Olympics.

References

External links
 

1902 births
1965 deaths
Norwegian male cyclists
Olympic cyclists of Norway
Cyclists at the 1928 Summer Olympics
Sportspeople from Trondheim